Todd Walter Lee (born February 20, 1964) is an American college basketball coach who is the former head coach of the South Dakota Coyotes men's basketball team.

Coaching career

Assistant coach (1986–2005)

After graduating from the University of South Dakota in 1986, Lee's first coaching job was as an assistant coach at Southwestern College in California where he stayed until 1989 when he joined Hank Egan's staff at San Diego from 1989 to 1992. Lee then headed to the professional ranks for two seasons as an assistant coach for the Rapid City Thrillers of the CBA under Eric Musselman.

Lee returned to college coaching as an assistant coach under Pat Douglass at Cal State Bakersfield where he was on staff for the Roadrunners 1997 NCAA Division II national title winning squad. Lee followed Douglass to UC Irvine as an assistant coach and was on staff until 2005.

Kentucky Wesleyan (2005–2013)
On May 28, 2005, Lee became head coach at Kentucky Wesleyan, an NCAA Division II school. Inheriting a program with limited scholarships due to NCAA sanctions, Lee had only 20 wins in his first two seasons. However, in eight seasons at Kentucky Wesleyan, Lee went 154-81 with five straight NCAA Division II Tournament appearances from 2008 to 2012, advancing to the Sweet 16 round in 2012.

Grand Canyon assistant (2013–2018)
On April 9, 2013, Lee joined Dan Majerle's staff at Grand Canyon as the team transitioned to Division I.

South Dakota (2018–2022)
On April 4, 2018 Lee was named the 19th head coach in South Dakota history, replacing Craig Smith, who departed for the Utah State head coaching position. Following a second place finish in the Summit League for the 2020–21 season, Lee was named Summit League Coach of the Year. He was fired on March 10, 2022, despite finishing with a 66-52 mark in four seasons.

Personal life

Lee grew up in Huron, South Dakota. He has three children; when he took the job at South Dakota in 2018, his wife and children stayed in Arizona.

Head coaching record

References

1964 births
Living people
American men's basketball coaches
Basketball coaches from South Dakota
Cal State Bakersfield Roadrunners men's basketball coaches
College men's basketball head coaches in the United States
Continental Basketball Association coaches
Grand Canyon Antelopes men's basketball coaches
Junior college men's basketball coaches in the United States
Kentucky Wesleyan Panthers men's basketball coaches
People from Huron, South Dakota
San Diego Toreros men's basketball coaches
South Dakota Coyotes men's basketball coaches
UC Irvine Anteaters men's basketball coaches
University of South Dakota alumni